Acanthatrium hitaensis is a species of a trematode, or fluke worm, in the family Lecithodendriidae.

Distribution
This species occurs in Japan and Thailand.

Life cycle
The first intermediate hosts of Acanthatrium hitaensis include freshwater snails Semisulcospira libertina and Tarebia  granifera.

References

Plagiorchiida
Animals described in 1953